La Bataille d'Albuera: Espagnol is a board game published in 1987 by Clash of Arms.

Contents
La Bataille d'Albuera: Espagnol is a game in which a battalion/regimental game covers the 1811 Battle of Albuera (known in French as the Bataille d'Albuera) in the Peninsular War.

Reception
Mike Siggins reviewed La Bataille d'Albuera: Espagnol for Games International magazine, and gave it 4 stars out of 5, and stated that "this is a game that represents an ideal sampler for the 'La Bataille' system and is highly recommended."

References

Board games introduced in 1987
Clash of Arms games